The 2014 AFC Annual Awards was the fourth year for AFC's awards for the top football players and coaches of the year. The awards were given out in Manila on 30 November 2014.

External links 
 Official page

Asian Football Confederation trophies and awards
AFC Annual Award, 2014